Star Maidens is a British-German science-fiction television series, made by Portman Productions for the ITV network. Produced in 1975, and first broadcast in 1976, it was filmed at Bray Studios and on location in Windsor and Bracknell, Berkshire, and Black Park, Buckinghamshire. The series was partly financed by a German company, Werbung im Rundfunk (Advertising in Broadcasting), which dealt with distributing funding from the limited commercials shown on West German public TV. In this case, it was acting on behalf of the channel ZDF, which showed the series in West Germany.

Overview
The series presents a "battle of the sexes" and role reversal scenario in which male protagonists must escape servitude to women of an advanced civilization.  The planet Medusa, home to a highly evolved and technologically advanced humanoid race, was already ruled by its women when a rogue comet knocked it out of its orbit of Proxima Centauri.  Drifting through space, the orphan planet's surface became uninhabitable, and the inhabitants survived by building underground cities.  The series begins with Medusa's entry into Earth's solar system.  At first heartened to discover Earth, the Medusans are disappointed to learn that the human men are dominant there.  Two Medusan men escape by stealing a ship and flying to Earth.  Despite a successful escape, the two are pursued by the Medusan security forces. When the Medusans fail to re-capture the two men, they bring two human hostages—a man and a woman—back with them to their home planet. The series' 13 episodes concern the two groups' attempts to adapt to life on the different planets while brokering an exchange for the hostages.  In the series finale, the Medusans' ship is pursued by another spacecraft, this one belonging to an alien race that has hunted Medusans in the past.  Despite their technology and the antagonism they displayed throughout the series, the Medusans prove incapable of actually fighting an enemy, and only the intervention of a Medusan ship flown by an Earth man defeats the enemy.  The saved Medusans return home, likely with an altered opinion of men.

Regarded as something of a camp novelty, it featured some female dominance elements. The series has some similarities with the British science-fiction series Space: 1999, whose second season was in pre production at Pinewood around the same time. Although Star Maidens was shot at Bray Studios by a different production company and did not benefit from as large a budget, both series featured the work of production designer Keith Wilson, whose props and set designs from Space: 1999 were adapted for Star Maidens, leading to a very similar look and feel. Even many of the sound effects from Space: 1999 were used. Lead actresses Judy Geeson and Lisa Harrow appeared in guest roles in the first season of Space: 1999, Geeson in the episode "Another Time, Another Place" and Harrow in "The Testament of Arkadia".

For the series' German dub, German natives Christiane Krüger and Christian Quadflieg provided their own voices, while the voices of the British cast were dubbed by other German actors.

Cast

Judy Geeson as Supreme Councillor Fulvia
Lisa Harrow as Dr. Liz Becker
Pierre Brice as Adam
Gareth Thomas as Shem
Christian Quadflieg as Dr. Rudi Schmidt
Christiane Krüger as Supreme Councillor Octavia
Derek Farr as Professor Evans
Dawn Addams as Clara

Episodes

 Escape to Paradise
 Nemesis
 The Nightmare Cannon
 The Proton Storm
 Kidnap
 The Trial
 Test for Love
 The Perfect Couple
 What Have They Done to the Rain?
 The End of Time
 Hideout
 Creatures of the Mind
 The Enemy

DVD release
The complete series of Star Maidens was released on Region 2 DVD from Delta Entertainment in 2005. The two-disc set includes an interview with actor Gareth Thomas as a special feature. In 2017, the series was re-released on DVD by Simply Media with new cover artwork.

Novelisation
A novelisation of the series, written by Ian Evans (a pseudonym of the sci-fi author Angus Wells), was published in the United Kingdom by Corgi Books in 1977.

A Large format tie-in hardback album with photos, stories, and comic strips was published by Stafford Pemberton in 1978.

References

External links

Star Maidens at OldFutures

1970s British drama television series
1976 British television series debuts
1976 British television series endings
Television episodes about alien abduction
1970s British science fiction television series
English-language television shows
Feminist science fiction
German drama television series
German science fiction television series
ITV television dramas
Serial drama television series
Space adventure television series
Television series set on fictional planets
Television shows produced by Scottish Television
Matriarchy
Rogue planets in fiction
Feminism and the arts